Ikenna Ihim  (born 27 October 1984), is a Nigerian-American doctor and philanthropist best known for his work on nasogastric intubation. Since 2020, he has been working on the frontline of the COVID-19 pandemic.

Education and career
Ihim graduated from University of Maryland, College Park with a degree in biology, before preceding to St. Matthew's University where he studied medicine and graduated in 2014. From 2015 to 2018, he went to Coney Island Hospital for his residency in internal medicine. He later got his medical license in North Carolina and became a board certified internist and started practicing in Fayetteville, North Carolina. During his time in the medical school, he furthered to Davenport University where he got an MBA in healthcare management, graduating in 2017.

Awards and recognition
Ihim received a chieftaincy title as Nze Ikeoha 1 of Nkwerre.

Personal life
Ihim was born in Owerri, Imo State, Nigeria. He is from Amorji-Ugwu, Nkwerre, Imo State. His father is Nze O.F.N. Ihim, a business tycoon and a former governorship candidate in Imo State. His mother is Daisy Ihim.

References

Living people
1984 births
People from Imo State
Nigerian philanthropists
American people of Igbo descent
St. Matthew's University alumni
University of Maryland, College Park alumni
Davenport University alumni
American internists
Physicians from New York (state)
20th-century American physicians
21st-century American physicians
20th-century African-American physicians
21st-century African-American physicians